Jeff Pilon (born March 21, 1976 in Ottawa, Ontario) is a former gridiron football offensive tackle. He was drafted by the Winnipeg Blue Bombers in the third round with the 17th overall pick in the 1999 CFL Draft. He played college football at Syracuse.

Hall has also been a member of the New York Jets, New York/New Jersey Hitmen and Calgary Stampeders. He won a Grey Cup with the Stampeders in 2001 and 2008.

External links
Calgary Stampeders bio

1976 births
Living people
American football offensive linemen
Calgary Stampeders players
Canadian football offensive linemen
Franco-Ontarian people
New York Jets players
New York/New Jersey Hitmen players
Players of Canadian football from Ontario
Canadian football people from Ottawa
Syracuse Orange football players
Winnipeg Blue Bombers players